Green tea is a type of tea that is made from Camellia sinensis leaves and buds that have not undergone the same withering and oxidation process which is used to make oolong teas and black teas. Green tea originated in China, and since then its production and manufacture has spread to other countries in East Asia.

Several varieties of green tea exist, which differ substantially based on the variety of C. sinensis used, growing conditions, horticultural methods, production processing, and time of harvest.

History

Tea consumption has its legendary origins in China during the reign of mythological Emperor Shennong.

A book written by Lu Yu in 618–907 AD (Tang dynasty), The Classic of Tea, is considered important in green tea history. The Kissa Yōjōki (喫茶養生記 Book of Tea, lit. Record [of] Drinking Tea [for] Nourishing Life), written by Zen priest Eisai in 1211, describes how drinking green tea may affect five vital organs, the shapes of tea plants, flowers and leaves, and how to grow and process tea leaves.

Steeping, brewing and serving

Steeping, or brewing, is the process of making tea from leaves and hot water, generally using  of tea per  of water (H2O) or about 1 teaspoon of green tea per 150 ml cup.

Generally, lower-quality green teas are steeped hotter and longer while higher-quality teas are steeped cooler and shorter, but usually multiple times (2–3 typically). Higher-quality teas like gyokuro use more tea leaves and are steeped multiple times for short durations. Steeping too hot or too long results in the release of excessive amounts of tannins, leading to a bitter, astringent brew, regardless of initial quality. The brew's taste is also affected by the steeping technique; two important techniques are to warm the steeping container beforehand to prevent the tea from immediately cooling down, and to leave the tea leaves in the pot and gradually add more hot water during consumption.

Extracts

Polyphenols found in green tea include epigallocatechin gallate (EGCG), epicatechin gallate, epicatechins and flavanols, which are under laboratory research for their potential effects in vivo. Other components include three kinds of flavonoids, known as kaempferol, quercetin, and myricetin. Although the mean content of flavonoids and catechins in a cup of green tea is higher than that in the same volume of other food and drink items that are traditionally considered to promote health, flavonoids and catechins have no proven biological effect in humans.

Green tea leaves are initially processed by soaking in an alcohol solution, which may be further concentrated to various levels; byproducts of the process are also packaged and used. Extracts are sold over the counter in liquid, powder, capsule, and tablet forms, and may contain up to 17.4% of their total weight in caffeine, though decaffeinated versions are also available.

Health effects 

Regular green tea is 99.9% water, provides 1 kcal per 100 mL serving, is devoid of significant nutrient content (table), and contains phytochemicals such as polyphenols and caffeine.

Numerous claims have been made for the health benefits of green tea, but human clinical research has not found good evidence of benefit. In 2011, a panel of scientists published a report on the claims for health effects at the request of the European Commission: in general they found that the claims made for green tea were not supported by sufficient scientific evidence. Although green tea may enhance mental alertness due to its caffeine content, there is only weak, inconclusive evidence that regular consumption of green tea affects the risk of cancer or cardiovascular diseases, and there is no evidence that it benefits weight loss.

A 2020 review by the Cochrane Collaboration listed some potential adverse effects of green tea extract including gastrointestinal disorders, higher levels of liver enzymes, and, more rarely, insomnia, raised blood pressure, and skin reactions.

Cancer
It has been suggested that it may inhibit cancer development and growth by preventing "cell damage" based on its antioxidant and anti-inflammatory properties.

However, Green tea interferes with the chemotherapy drug bortezomib (Velcade) and other boronic acid-based proteasome inhibitors, and should be avoided by people taking these medications.

Cardiovascular disease
A meta-analysis of observational studies reported an increase in one cup of green tea per day was correlated with slightly lower risk of death from cardiovascular causes. Green tea consumption may be correlated with a reduced risk of stroke. Meta-analyses of randomized controlled trials found that green tea consumption for 3–6 months may produce small reductions (about 2–3 mm Hg each) in systolic and diastolic blood pressures. A separate systematic review and meta-analysis of randomized controlled trials found that consumption of 5-6 cups of green tea per day was associated with a small reduction in systolic blood pressure (2 mmHg), but did not lead to a significant difference in diastolic blood pressure.

Glycemic control
Green tea consumption lowers fasting blood sugar but in clinical studies the beverage's effect on haemoglobin A1c and fasting insulin levels was inconsistent.

Hyperlipidemia
Drinking green tea or taking green tea supplements decreases the blood concentration of total cholesterol (about 3–7 mg/dL), LDL cholesterol (about 2 mg/dL), and does not affect the concentration of HDL cholesterol or triglycerides. A 2013 Cochrane meta-analysis of longer-term randomized controlled trials (>3 months duration) concluded that green tea consumption lowers total and LDL cholesterol concentrations in the blood.

Inflammation
A 2015 systematic review and meta-analysis of 11 randomized controlled trials found that green tea consumption was not significantly associated with lower plasma levels of C-reactive protein levels (a marker of inflammation).

Weight loss
There is no good evidence that green tea aids in weight loss or weight maintenance.

Potential for liver toxicity
Excessive consumption of green tea extract has been associated with hepatotoxicity and liver failure. In 2018, a scientific panel for the European Food Safety Authority reviewed the safety of green tea consumption over a low-moderate range of daily EGCG intake from 90 to 300 mg per day, and with exposure from high green tea consumption estimated to supply up to 866 mg EGCG per day. Dietary supplements containing EGCG may supply up to 1000 mg EGCG and other catechins per day. The panel concluded that EGCG and other catechins from green tea in low-moderate daily amounts are generally regarded as safe, but in some cases of excessive consumption of green tea or use of high-EGCG supplements, liver toxicity may occur.

Production
In 2013, global production of green tea was approximately 1.7 million tonnes, with a forecast to double in volume by 2023. As of 2015, China provided 80% of the world's green tea market, leading to its green tea exports rising by 9% annually, while exporting 325,000 tonnes in 2015. In 2015, the US was the largest importer  of Chinese green tea (6,800 tonnes), an increase of 10% over 2014, and Britain imported 1,900 tonnes, 15% more than in 2014.

Growing, harvesting and processing

Green tea is processed and grown in a variety of ways, depending on the type of green tea desired. As a result of these methods, maximum amounts of polyphenols and volatile organic compounds are retained, affecting aroma and taste. The growing conditions can be broken down into two basic types − those grown in the sun and those grown under the shade. The green tea plants are grown in rows that are pruned to produce shoots in a regular manner, and in general are harvested three times per year. The first flush takes place in late April to early May. The second harvest usually takes place from June through July, and the third picking takes place in late July to early August. Sometimes, there will also be a fourth harvest. The first flush in the spring brings the best-quality leaves, with higher prices to match.

Green tea is processed after picking using either artisanal or modern methods. Sun-drying, basket or charcoal firing, or pan-firing are common artisanal methods. Oven-drying, tumbling, or steaming are common modern methods. This aracha has yet to be refined at this stage, with a final firing taking place before blending, selection and packaging take place. The leaves in this state will be re-fired throughout the year as they are needed, giving the green teas a longer shelf-life and better flavour. The first flush tea of May will readily store in this fashion until the next year's harvest. After this re-drying process, each crude tea will be sifted and graded according to size. Finally, each lot will be blended according to the blending order by the tasters and packed for sale.

Import of radioactive Japanese tea
On 17 June 2011, at Charles de Gaulle airport in Paris, France, radioactive caesium of 1,038 becquerels per kilogram was measured in tea leaves imported from Shizuoka Prefecture, Japan as a result of the Fukushima Daiichi nuclear disaster on 11 March, which was more than twice the restricted amount in the European Union of 500 becquerels per kilogram. The government of France announced that they rejected the leaves, which totalled .

In response, the governor of Shizuoka Prefecture, Heita Kawakatsu, stated: "there is absolutely no problem when they [people] drink them because it will be diluted to about 10 becquerels per kilogram when they steep them even if the leaves have 1,000 becquerels per kilogram;" a statement backed by tests done in Shizuoka. Japanese Minister for Consumer Affairs and Food Safety Renhō stated on 3 June 2011 that "there are cases in which aracha [whole leaves of Japanese green tea] are sold as furikake [condiments sprinkled on rice] and so on and they are eaten as they are, therefore we think that it is important to inspect tea leaves including aracha from the viewpoint of consumers' safety."

In 2018, the US Food and Drug Administration updated its import status on Japanese products deemed to be contaminated by radionuclides, indicating that tea from the Ibaraki prefecture had been removed from the list by the Government of Japan in 2015.

Green tea across East Asia

China and Taiwan  

 

Loose leaf green tea has been the most popular form of tea in China since at least the Southern Song dynasty. While Chinese green tea was originally steamed, as it still is in Japan, after the early Ming dynasty it has typically been processed by being pan-fired in a dry wok. Other processes employed in China today include oven-firing, basket-firing, tumble-drying and sun-drying. Green tea is the most widely produced form of tea in China, with 1.42 million tons grown in 2014.

Popular green teas produced in China today include:
 Biluochun (碧螺春) Produced in Jiangsu, this tea is named after the shape of the leaves, which are curled like snails.
 Chun Mee (珍眉) Known in English by its Cantonese name, and popular outside China. It has a plum-like flavour.
Gunpowder tea  (珠茶) A tea which is tumble-dried so that each leaf is rolled into a small pellet that resembles gunpowder.
 Huangshan Maofeng (黄山毛峰) A type of maofeng tea grown in the microclimate of the Huangshan mountain range in Anhui province. Maofeng teas are harvested by plucking intact two equal-sized leaves and a bud together.
 Longjing (龍井茶) Also known as "Dragon Well" tea, the English translation of its name. Grown near Hangzhou in Zhejiang province, Longjing is the most well-known pan-fired Chinese green tea. Its flavour derives partly from the terroir of the region in which it is produced.
 Lu'an Melon Seed (六安瓜片) Grown in Anhui province. Unlike typical Chinese teas, two leaves are plucked separately from each branch, with no bud and no stems. Harvested later in the season, it has a grassier flavour than typical Chinese green teas.
 Taiping Houkui (太平猴魁) Grown in Anhui province. Uses a cultivar with an unusually large leaf. The production process flattens the tea leaves, creating the so-called "two knives and a pole" shape from the leaves and stem.
 Xinyang Maojian (信陽毛尖) A type of maojian tea grown in Xinyang, Henan province. Maojian teas are harvested by plucking a bud and one leaf together.

Japan 

 

Tea seeds were first brought to Japan in the early 9th century by the Buddhist monks Saicho and Kūkai. During the Heian period (794–1185), Emperor Saga introduced the practice of drinking tea to the imperial family. The Zen Buddhist priest Eisai (1141–1215), founder of the Rinzai school of Buddhism, brought tea seeds from China to plant in various places in Japan. Eisai advocated that all people, not just Buddhist monks and the elite, drink tea for its health benefits.

The oldest tea-producing region in Japan is Uji, located near the former capital of Kyoto. It is thought that seeds sent by Eisai were planted in Uji, becoming the basis of the tea industry there. Today, Japan's most expensive premium teas are still grown in Uji. The largest tea-producing area today is Shizuoka Prefecture, which accounts for 40% of total Japanese sencha production. Other major tea-producing regions include the island of Kyushu and the prefectures of Shiga, Gifu, and Saitama in central Honshu.

All commercial tea produced in Japan today is green tea, though for a brief period black tea was also produced in the late 19th and early 20th centuries. Japanese tea production is heavily mechanized, and is characterized by the use of modern technology and processes to improve yields and reduce labour. Because of the high cost of labour in Japan, only the highest quality teas are plucked and processed by hand in the traditional fashion.

Japanese green teas have a thin, needle-like shape and a rich, dark green colour. Unlike Chinese teas, most Japanese teas are produced by steaming rather than pan-firing. This produces their characteristic colour, and creates a sweeter, more grassy flavour. A mechanical rolling/drying process then dries the tea leaves into their final shape. The liquor of steamed Japanese tea tends to be cloudy due to the higher quantity of dissolved solids.

Most Japanese teas are blended from leaves grown in different regions, with less emphasis on terroir than in the Chinese market. Because of the limited quantity of tea that can be produced in Japan, the majority of production is dedicated to the premium tea market. Cheaper bottled teas and tea-flavoured food products usually use lower-grade Japanese-style tea produced in China.

Although a variety of commercial tea cultivars exist in Japan, the vast majority of Japanese tea is produced using the Yabukita cultivar developed in the 1950s.

Popular Japanese green teas include:
 Bancha (番茶) A lower-grade tea plucked from the same bushes used to produce sencha. It has a somewhat bolder flavour, and is plucked each season after sencha production is finished.
 Genmaicha (玄米茶) Made by combining sencha tea leaves with toasted puffs of rice.
 Gyokuro (玉露) Grown under shade for three weeks prior to plucking, gyokuro is one of the most exclusive varieties of tea produced in Japan. The shading technique imparts a sweeter flavour, and produces a particularly rich colour thanks to the higher amounts of chlorophyll in the shaded leaf. Gyokuro tea is associated with the Uji region, the first tea-growing region in Japan. It is often made using smaller-leaf cultivars of the tea plant.
 Hōjicha (焙じ茶) This type of tea is made by roasting sencha or bancha leaves with kukicha twigs.
 Kabusecha (かぶせ茶) Similar to gyokuro, kabusecha is shaded for only a week prior to plucking. Its flavour is somewhat between that of gyokuro and normal sencha.
 Kukicha (茎茶) A blended tea made of sencha leaves and stems.
 Matcha (抹茶) Like gyokuro, matcha is shaded before plucking. The plucked and processed leaf is called tencha. This product is then ground into a fine powder, which is matcha. Because the tea powder is very perishable, matcha is usually sold in small quantities. It is typically rather expensive. Matcha is the type of tea used in the Japanese tea ceremony. It is prepared by whisking the tea with hot water in a bowl, until the surface is frothy. If the water is too hot, the tea may become overly bitter.
 Sencha (煎茶) This type of tea is produced throughout the tea season, and is the standard style today, representing 80% of all tea produced in Japan. 90% of sencha is grown from the Yabukita cultivar.
 Shincha (新茶) The first early harvest of tea, plucked before the first flush, is called shincha. Shincha is made from the youngest new growth leaves, and is plucked from early April to early May. Shincha typically refers to the early harvest of sencha, but can refer to any type of tea plucked early in the season, before the main harvest. Because of the limited quantities in which it is produced, shincha is highly prized and expensive to obtain.

Korea 

 

According to Record of Gaya cited in Memorabilia of the Three Kingdoms, the legendary queen Heo Hwang-ok, a princess of the Ayodhya married to King Suro of Gaya, brought the tea plant from India and planted it in Baegwolsan, a mountain in current Changwon. However, it is a widely held view that systematic planting of tea bushes began with the introduction of Chinese tea culture by the Buddhist monks around the 4th century. Amongst some of the earliest Buddhist temples in Korea, Bulgapsa (founded in 384, in Yeonggwang), Bulhoesa (founded in 384, in Naju) and Hwaeomsa (founded in Gurye, in 544) claim to be the birthplace of Korean tea culture. Green tea was commonly offered to Buddha, as well as to the spirits of deceased ancestors. Tea culture continued to prosper during the Goryeo Dynasty, with the tea offering being a part of the biggest national ceremonies and tea towns were formed around temples. Seon-Buddhist manners of ceremony prevailed. During the Joseon Dynasty, however, Korean tea culture underwent secularization, along with the Korean culture itself. Korean ancestral rite jesa, also referred to as charye ("tea rite"), has its origin in darye ("tea rite"), the practice of offering tea as simple ancestral rites by the royal family and the aristocracy in Joseon.

Tea culture of Korea was actively suppressed by the Japanese during the Japanese forced occupation period (1910‒1945), and the subsequent Korean War (1950‒1953) made it even harder for the Korean tea tradition to survive. The restoration of the Korean way of tea began in the 1970s, around Dasolsa. Commercial production of green tea in South Korea only began in the 1970s,. By 2012 the industry was producing 20% as much tea as Taiwan and 3.5% as much as Japan. Green tea is not as popular as coffee or other types of Korean teas in modern South Korea. Recently however, as the coffee market reached saturation point, South Korean tea production doubled during 2010‒2014, as did tea imports during 2009–2015, despite very high tariff rate (513.6% for green tea, compared to 40% for black tea, 8% for processed/roasted coffee, and 2% for raw coffee beans).

Korean green tea can be classified into various types based on several different factors. The most common is the flush, or the time of the year when the leaves are plucked (and thus also by leaf size).
 UjeonUjeon, or cheonmul-cha, is made of hand-picked leaves plucked before gogu (20–21 April).
 SejakSejak, or dumul-cha, is made of hand-picked leaves plucked after gogu (20–21 April) but before ipha (5–6 May). The tea is also called jakseol as the tea leaves are plucked when they are about the size of a sparrow's tongue.
 JungjakJungjak, or semul-cha, is made of leaves plucked after ipha (5–6 May) until the mid May.
 DaejakDaejak, or kkeunmul-cha, is made of tea leaves plucked in late May and after. It is usually made into tea bags or used in cooking.

The mode of preparation also differs:
 Ipcha (yeopcha)The synonyms ipcha and yeopcha refer to loose leaf tea, often in contrast to tea in tea bags. As the words mean "leaf tea", they can also be used in contrast to powdered tea.
 Garucha (malcha)The synonyms garucha and malcha refer to powdered tea.

Leaf teas are processed either by roasting or steaming.
 Deokkeum-cha (bucho-cha)Roasting is the most common and traditional way of tea processing in Korea. Also translated into "pan-fried tea", the deokkeum-cha or bucho-cha varieties are richer in flavour.
 Jeungje-chaSteaming is less popular in Korean green tea processing, but the method is still used in temple cuisine. Tea prepared with steamed tea leaves, called jeungje-cha, are more vivid in colour.

Southern, warmer regions such as Boseong in South Jeolla Province, Hadong in South Gyeongsang Province, and Jeju Island are famous for producing high-quality tea leaves.
 Banya-chaBanya-cha is one of the most renowned Korean green teas. This steamed tea is developed by Buddhist monks in Boseong. The tea is grown on sandy loam near mountains and sea. The word banya is a Korean transliteration of the Buddhist concept prajñā. 
 Jungno-chaJungno-cha is one of the most renowned Korean green teas. The roasted variety of tea is made of tea leaves grown among the bamboo in Gimhae, Hadong, and Jinju in South Gyeongsang Province.
Green tea can be blended with other ingredients.
 Hyeonmi-nokchaNokcha (green tea) blended with hyeonmi-cha (brown rice tea) is called hyeonmi-nokcha.
 Remon-nokcha Nokcha (green tea) blended with lemon is called remon-nokcha.

See also

 Chinese tea culture
 Japanese tea ceremony
 Korean tea
 List of ineffective cancer treatments
 Epigallocatechin gallate
 List of Chinese teas
 Potential effects of tea on health
 Sinecatechins
 White tea
 Yellow tea

References

Other reading

External links

 NCCIH - Green Tea Side Effects and Cautions (From the National Center for Complementary and Integrative Health)

 
Chinese tea
Japanese tea
Korean tea